The crooked knife sometimes referred to as a "curved knife", "carving knife," or "mocotaugan," from the Cree term "môhkotâkan," is a woodworking knife, typically with a curved end. The crooked knife is a common tool found amongst the native Americans of the Eastern Woodlands as well as non-native woodworkers. The crooked in "crooked knife" refers to its unusual shape with the handle set at an oblique angle to the blade. The blade can be straight or curved, long or short and can be made of a steel forged specifically for the knife, or from reused hardened steel from another source. The shape of the blade, whether curved or straight, is a function of the carving purpose of the user: straight for whittling wood, making splints for baskets and incising, curved for hollowing out bowls and masks and ladles, as well as myriad other usages.

The 1971 documentary César et son canot d'écorce (César's Bark Canoe) illustrates the use of a crooked knife in the construction of a birch-bark canoe.

Description and Usage 

John McPhee states, "The blade was bent near its outer end (enabling it to move in grooves and hollows where the straight part could not). The grip, fashioned for convenience of a hand closing over it, was bulbous. The blade had no hinge and protruded rigidly - but not straight out. It formed a shallow V with the grip."

Adney and Chapelle state, "The knife, held with the cutting edge toward the user, was grasped fingers-up with the thumb of the holding hand laid along the part of the handle projecting away from the user. This steadied the knife in cutting. Unlike a jackknife, the crooked knife was not used to whittle but to cut toward the user, and was, in effect, a one-hand drawknife."

According to Henri Vaillancourt, "The original crooked knife was made out of a beaver's tooth."

References

Further reading/external links

The Native-American Mocotaugan / Couteau Croche / Crooked Knife, article and bibliography by Paul H. S. Gaboriault
The Crooked Knife article at the Native Art in Canada website
crooked knife circa 1750 from the Davistown Museum collection

Knives
Native American tools